British NorthWest Airlines was an airline based at Blackpool International Airport.

British North West Airlines Limited (traded as British NorthWest Airlines) was incorporated in October 2001, the airline had a Civil Aviation Authority Type B Operating licence (they were permitted to carry passengers, cargo and mail on aircraft with fewer than 20 seats and/or weighing less than 10 tonnes). In December 2006, according to the airlines website, the airline had ceased trading on scheduled services.

Destinations
The airline operated scheduled services to:
 Belfast (Belfast City Airport)
 Blackpool (Blackpool International Airport)
 Isle of Man (Isle of Man Airport)

These routes were passed over to Manx2, later known as Citywing.

Fleet 
The British NorthWest Airlines fleet consisted of the following aircraft: 

2 Piper PA-31 Navajo
1 Jetstream 31

See also
 List of defunct airlines of the United Kingdom

External links
British NorthWest Airlines 
Information to British Northwest Airlines about transferring to manx2

Airlines established in 2001
Airlines disestablished in 2006
Companies based in Blackpool
Defunct airlines of the United Kingdom
History of Blackpool